Thomas Woodnutt Miller (June 26, 1886 – May 5, 1973) was an American politician serving as a Republican U.S. Representative for Delaware's at-large congressional district. He was a veteran of World War I and a member of the American Legion, who served as a National Legislative Committee chairman.

Early life and education
Thomas Woodnutt Miller was born in Wilmington, Delaware, son of Governor Charles R. and Abigail Morgan Woodnutt Miller. He attended The Hotchkiss School and graduated from Yale University in 1908. He was initially employed as a steel roller by the Bethlehem Steel Company in 1908 and 1909.

Political career
Miller worked as secretary to U.S. Representative William H. Heald from 1910 until 1912, and during this period studied law in Washington, D.C. He was appointed by his father, Governor Charles R. Miller, to the position of Delaware Secretary of State from 1913 until 1915.

Miller was elected to the United States House of Representatives in 1914, defeating incumbent Democratic U.S. Representative Franklin Brockson. During this term, he served in the Republican minority in the 64th Congress. Seeking reelection in 1916, he lost to Democrat Albert F. Polk, a lawyer from Georgetown. Miller served from March 4, 1915, until March 3, 1917, during the administration of U.S. President Woodrow Wilson.

World War I
When the United States entered World War I in April 1917 (see American entry into World War I), Miller enlisted as a private in the infantry of the United States Army, and served in France with the Seventy-Ninth Division. He was cited by General John J. Pershing, commander of the American Expeditionary Forces (AEF), for "especially meritorious and conspicuous service" in the Meuse–Argonne offensive and awarded the Purple Heart for his service. For this, he was promoted to lieutenant colonel and served until discharged in September 1919. Miller was a founder and incorporator of the American Legion and vice chairman of the Paris caucus in March 1919. He was also Alien Property Custodian from 1921 until 1925 and a member of the American Battle Monuments Commission from 1923 until 1926.

Conviction and parole
Miller served in the administration of United States President Warren G. Harding, but was convicted in 1927 of conspiring to defraud the U.S. government. The conviction concerned Miller's service as Alien Property Custodian and the effort by Metallgesellschaft AG of Germany to overturn the U.S. government's confiscation of its interest in the American Metal Company during World War I. He served 18 months in prison and was paroled in 1929 and pardoned by United States President Herbert Hoover in 1933.

Later life and death
At this point, Miller moved to Reno, Nevada, where he spent the rest of his life. There he became the founder of Nevada State parks system and served as chairman of the Nevada State Park Commission in 1935, 1936, from 1953 to 1959, and from 1967 to 1973. He also continued his activity in veteran's affairs as staff field representative of the United States Veterans' Employment Service from 1945 until 1957. He died in Reno, Nevada on May 5, 1973, and was buried in the Masonic Memorial Gardens in Reno.

Personal life
His nephew, Clement W. Miller was a U.S. Representative from California from 1959 until 1962.

Almanac
Elections are held the first Tuesday after November 1. U.S. Representatives took office March 4 and have a two-year term.

See also 
 List of members of the American Legion
 List of people from Delaware
 List of Yale University people
List of people pardoned or granted clemency by the president of the United States

References

Further reading

External links

 
 Thomas W. Miller at The Political Graveyard
 
 
 

1886 births
1973 deaths
20th-century American politicians
Bethlehem Steel people
Burials in Nevada
Delaware lawyers
Delaware politicians convicted of crimes
Harding administration personnel
Military personnel from Delaware
Nevada Republicans
People from Wilmington, Delaware
Politicians convicted of conspiracy to defraud the United States
Politicians from Reno, Nevada
Recipients of American presidential pardons
Republican Party members of the United States House of Representatives from Delaware
United States Army officers
United States Army personnel of World War I
Yale University alumni